Minnesota North College is a public community college composed of six campuses in northeast Minnesota: Hibbing campus;  Itasca Campus (Grand Rapids), Mesabi Range - Eveleth; Mesabi Range - Virginia; Vermilion (Ely); and Rainy River (International Falls). It is a member of the Minnesota State Colleges and Universities system and was formed in 2022 by merging five independent community colleges of Hibbing Community College, Itasca Community College, Mesabi Range College, Vermilion Community College, and Rainy River Community College on six campuses in northeastern Minnesota:

See also

 List of colleges and universities in Minnesota
 Higher education in Minnesota

References

External links
 
 Official athletics website

 
Community colleges in Minnesota
2022 establishments in Minnesota
Educational institutions established in 2022
Minnesota North College